Silverthorn is the tenth studio album by the American power metal band Kamelot. The album was released on the Steamhammer label, a division of SPV, in October 2012 worldwide. It is the first album to feature Tommy Karevik as the lead singer and their third concept album, after Epica (2003) and The Black Halo (2005). The concept and story are original, and features a 19th-century little girl named Jolee, who dies in a tragic accident witnessed by her twin brothers. The story deals with how the girl's affluent family handles the tragic event, leading to cover-ups, secrets, and betrayal. The cover by Stefan Heilemann shows Jolee, the main character and angel of afterlife, as an adult.

Music video
A music video was released for the promotional single "Sacrimony (Angel of Afterlife)". The video focuses on the story, mainly on the death of the main character, Jolee. The first part of the video takes place in 1863, with Jolee's two brothers flying a kite on the roof of their house, Jolee joins them and shortly after, a strong wind causes one of the brothers to step back, accidentally pushing Jolee off of the roof and into the river next to the house. The father then confronts the mother about the incident and roughly shoves her backward before roughly beating one of the boys while the other sits, crying and frustrated about the incident. Twenty-five years later in 1888, the two brothers, one still being frustrated, are sitting with each other while their father comes in with the intention of harming them. One stands up to his father and throws him on the ground. The father suffers a heart attack and dies. At the end of the video, one of the brothers hallucinates seeing Jolee while imprisoned and hugs her, only to reveal he is hugging nothing but empty air. Elize Ryd & Alissa White-Gluz were both featured in the video.

Another video for the single "My Confession" was posted on 10 July 2013 featuring the string quartet group, Eklipse. On August 27, the band released "Falling Like The Fahrenheit" as the last video for the album, featuring moments with fans and on stage.

Critical reception

The album received mainly positive views, with critics applauding Tommy Karevik's performance as the new lead singer.

Metal Underground praised the album with a four and a half stars out of five stating "'Silverthorn' may appear to be a return of sorts to the uptempo styles of pre-“Poetry." " Blabbermouth also gave the album a positive review saying "For now, Kamelot continues to storm through their glory ride on the surge of a still-hefty fan base no doubt breathing easy that the unexpected departure of Roy Khan didn't lay this unit on the wayside. Instead, the equally animated Tommy Karevik (Seventh Wonder) steps into Khan's place, wielding his own arsenal of gusty altos and elevating passaggios to keep Kamelot humming on their tenth studio album, Silverthorn."

Track listing

Personnel 
Credits for Silverthorn adapted from liner notes.

Kamelot
 Tommy Karevik – vocals
 Thomas Youngblood – guitars
 Sean Tibbetts – bass
 Oliver Palotai – keyboards, orchestrations
 Casey Grillo – drums, percussion

Additional personnel
 Elize Ryd – clean female vocals on "Sacrimony (Angel of Afterlife)", "Veritas", and "Falling Like the Fahrenheit", choir vocals
 Alissa White-Gluz – guttural vocals on "Sacrimony (Angel of Afterlife)" and clean female vocals on "Prodigal Son Part III: The Journey"
 Cinzia Rizzo – vocals on "Continuum"
 Sascha Paeth – additional guitars, growls
 Annelise Youngblood – nursery rhymes, child choir vocals
 István Tamás – accordion on "Veritas"
 Eklipse – strings on "Sacrimony (Angel of Afterlife)", "Falling Like the Fahrenheit" and "My Confession"
 Apollo Papathanasio – vocals on "Grace"
 Niclas Engelin – guitar on "Grace"
 Amanda Somerville – backing vocals, choir vocals, concept

Silverthorn Children's Choir 
 Emilie Paeth, Noa Rizzo

Silverthorn Choir
 Robert Hunecke-Rizzo, Thomas Rettke, Simon Oberender, Cinzia Rizzo

Production
 Sascha Paeth – producer, engineer, mixing
 Miro – keyboards, orchestrations, producer, engineering
 Simon Oberender – additional guitars, growls, engineering, mastering
 Olaf Reitmeier – engineering
 Jim Morris – engineering
 Michelle Holtkamp– engineering
 Johan Larsson – engineering
 Kai Schumacher – engineering
 Luca Turilli – Latin consultant
 Stefan Heilemann – cover art

Charts

References 

2012 albums
Kamelot albums
Concept albums
SPV/Steamhammer albums
King Records (Japan) albums